Jack Ainsley (born 17 September 1990) is an English footballer who plays as a defender for Stowmarket Town.

Club career

Early career
Born in Ipswich, Suffolk, His father George Ainsley and brother Stuart Ainsley also were at Ipswich as youngsters but never broke into the first team. Ainsley first started his career as a striker with an impressive goal ratio at youth level but since his professional contract Ainsley has currently adapted to right back or centre back.

Ipswich Town
Ainsley signed a one-year professional contract on 9 June 2009 with Ipswich Town despite interest from a number of Premier League clubs. Ainsley made his debut for Ipswich Town in a 3–3 draw with Shrewsbury Town after extra time in the League Cup, which was won 4–2 in a penalty shootout.

On 30 April 2010 he signed a one-year extension with the club. On 7 August he made his Football League debut replacing Mark Kennedy in the 89th minute in a 3–1 win over Middlesbrough. In April 2011 he was awarded an initial six-month contract extension by the club.

Ainsley made his first league start for Ipswich, playing as a centre back in their 7–1 away defeat to Peterborough on Saturday 21 August 2011.
On 20 December 2011 Jack Ainsley signed a new contract keeping him at Portman Road until June 2013.

Rushden & Diamonds (loan)
On 6 November 2009, Ainsley went on loan to Rushden & Diamonds. He only made one appearance which angered the then Ipswich manager Roy Keane and the local press. Keane quoted in a press conference: "He certainly won't be going back there. None of our players will be going there. It's not the first time that club's done that to a player. Not at this club, but I've spoken to other managers. If a club comes in and we feel he might get a reasonable chance we might send him out again, which is why we send them out on loan. When a player's really not given an opportunity then you have concerns. But, as I say, I think it's happened to one or two other players who've gone there. There's a bit of history with their manager Justin Edinburgh you see. There's a bit of history with everyone.".

Histon (loan)
On 19 November 2010, Ainsey went on loan to Histon, struggling at the foot of the Conference National, on a one-month deal. He went straight into their squad for the match at Luton Town on 20 November 2010, but could not prevent the side from losing 5–1; Histon were relegated, having finished bottom of the table, at the end of the season.

Chelmsford City (loan)
On 26 February 2013, Ainsley joined Conference South side Chelmsford City on a month's loan. On 27 March the loan was extended until the end of the season.

Lowestoft Town
In July 2013, Ainsley signed a two-year contract to play with Isthmian League Premier Division side Lowestoft Town. This will see him line up alongside his brother Stuart, who was already at the club.

Leiston
In February 2016, Ainsley joined Isthmian League Premier Division side Leiston.

Felixstowe & Walton United
In June 2018, Ainsley signed for Felixstowe & Walton United.

Stowmarket Town
In June 2019, Ainsley signed for Stowmarket Town.

International career
On 30 June 2006, Ainsley was called into the England U17's squad playing in the Nordic Cup. Ainsley scored on his debut against Sweden in a 4–2 win and then scored two as England defeated Norway 2–1. Ainsley won four caps scoring three goals but England lost in the final to Denmark 4–0.

Club statistics

References

External links
  Ipswich Town profile and career statistics

1990 births
Living people
Sportspeople from Ipswich
English footballers
England youth international footballers
Association football defenders
Ipswich Town F.C. players
Rushden & Diamonds F.C. players
Histon F.C. players
Chelmsford City F.C. players
Lowestoft Town F.C. players
Leiston F.C. players
Felixstowe & Walton United F.C. players
Stowmarket Town F.C. players
National League (English football) players
English Football League players